Alexander Ayala García  (born December 31, 1981) is a Cuban professional baseball shortstop who currently plays for Toros de Camagüey in the Cuban National Series. 

Ayala played for the Cuban national baseball team at the 2010 Haarlem Baseball Week and 2017 World Baseball Classic.

References

External links

1981 births
Living people
Cuban baseball players
Baseball shortstops
Ganaderos de Camaguey players
2017 World Baseball Classic players